José Rufino Pompeyo Echenique Benavente (November 16, 1808 in Puno, Peru – June 16, 1887 in Lima, Peru) served as the 12th President of Peru from 1851 to 1855.

He participated in the Peruvian War of Independence. In 1851, Echenique won the presidential elections to succeed Ramón Castilla. Under his government, the first civil laws of Peru were promulgated, and slavery was abolished. The finalizing phase of the construction of the Tacna-Arica railroad was also completed.

Echenique was overthrown by a liberal revolution led by Ramón Castilla in 1855 after a ball hosted by his wife, Victoria Tristán. He served as the President of the Chamber of Deputies in 1864, and President of the Senate from 1868 to 1871.

His son, Juan Martín Echenique, was also active in Peruvian politics.

Echenique hosted the Post-Impressionist painter Paul Gauguin and Gauguin's mother in his presidential home in central Lima from 1849 to 1854, during Gauguin's childhood.

See also
 List of presidents of Peru

References

1808 births
1887 deaths
People from Puno Region
Peruvian people of Basque descent
Presidents of Peru
Presidents of the Senate of Peru
Presidents of the Chamber of Deputies of Peru
Freemasons